The Central Library is the main branch of the Brooklyn Public Library, located at Flatbush Avenue and Eastern Parkway on Grand Army Plaza in Brooklyn, New York City. It contains over a million cataloged books, magazines, and multimedia materials. Each year, over one million people visit the library. The building is a designated New York City landmark.

Facility
The 352,000 square foot building contains the S. Stevan  Dweck Center for Contemporary Culture, a 189-seat auditorium that opened in 2007 and hosts lectures, readings, musical performances, and other events for people of all ages.  The library's plaza, renovated during the construction of the Dweck Center, hosts concerts throughout the summer and has become a favorite outdoor destination for free wireless internet access.

The Shelby White and Leon Levy Information Commons opened in January 2013. The space is used for individual work, public classes, private events, and meetings.

The Central Library's local history division, The Brooklyn Collection, holds over a million individual items including photographs, maps, manuscripts, Brooklyn Dodgers memorabilia and other ephemeral items.

History

Groundbreaking for a Brooklyn central library on Prospect Park Plaza (now Grand Army Plaza) occurred in 1912. The original architect Raymond Almirall had designed a domed, four-story Beaux-Arts building, similar in style to the adjacent Brooklyn Museum.  Escalating costs and political infighting slowed construction throughout the decade. Because of World War I and the Great Depression, Almirall's building was never completed except for the Flatbush Avenue wing, which was finished in 1929.

In the 1930s, architects Githens and Keally were commissioned to redesign the building in the Art Deco style, eliminating the expensive ornamentation and the fourth floor. Construction recommenced in 1938, and Almirall's building on Flatbush Avenue was largely demolished except for the frame, but some of the original facade along the library's parking lot is still visible. Completed by late 1940, the Central Library opened to the public on February 1, 1941.  It was publicly and critically acclaimed at the time.

The second floor of the Central Library opened in 1955, nearly doubling the amount of space available to the public. Prior to 1941 the Library's administrative offices were located in the Williamsburgh Savings Bank on Flatbush Avenue.

The Central Library was listed on the National Register of Historic Places in 2002.

See also
Brooklyn Visual Heritage
List of New York City Landmarks
National Register of Historic Places listings in Kings County, New York

References
Notes

External links

Brooklyn Public Library – Central Library

1940 establishments in New York City
Art Deco architecture in Brooklyn
Brooklyn Public Library
Carnegie libraries in New York City
Federal depository libraries
Grand Army Plaza
Libraries in Brooklyn
Libraries on the National Register of Historic Places in New York City
Library buildings completed in 1940
National Register of Historic Places in Brooklyn
New York City Designated Landmarks in Brooklyn
Park Slope
Prospect Heights, Brooklyn
Prospect Park (Brooklyn)